Eti-Osa is a Local Government Area of Lagos State in Nigeria. Lagos State Government administers  the council area as Ikoyi-Obalende LCDA, Eti-Osa East, and Iru Victoria Island LCDA. Within Eti-Osa are several important areas of Lagos State, including Lagos' Victoria Island. Before the Nigerian Capital moved to Abuja, Eti-Osa  Local Government Area served alongside Lagos Island  Local Government Area as the seat of the national capital. Eti-osa used to be the poorest neighborhood in Lagos State until development changed it to become one of the most prosperous areas where the richest Nigerians live in Lagos.

Population
Eti-Osa Local Government Area has a population of 283,791, which represents 3.11% of the state's population. 158,858 of the total population are male while the remaining 124,933 are female.

Geography of Eti-Osa 
The local government area has two normal seasons which are dry and rainy seasons. The temperature of the area is 25 degrees centigrade with wind blowing on the averages of 13 km/Hour.

Demographic

.

The people of Eti-Osa are predominantly from the Awori Yoruba. However, like most parts of Lagos State, it is currently home to a diverse mix of ethnicities from all over the country. The population including people from Hausa, Igbo and other tribes.

Business and Industry
There are fewer industries within Eti-Osa. Most residents work in fishing, farming, and trading. However, being the former location of the nation's capital, Eti-Osa is home to many large domestic and international businesses. Eti-Osa is a commercial area that has several public and private institutions with Banks, hotels, clubs and modern markets where the exchange of good and services take place. In 2009, Eti-Osa was placed under study for commercial horticultural practices in Nigeria, where it was discovered that it had 75 gardens that were concentrated in Ikoyi and Victoria Island.

Politics and Elections in Eti-Osa 
On 25 February 2023, Nigeria had its Presidential and Federal Legislative election. In Eti-Osa Local Government Area of Lagos, the Labour Party (LP) candidate, Mr. Thaddeus Attah was declared the winner by INEC Returning Officer to represent the Federal Constituency Seat. However, the result generated contests as the Party agents from APC and PDP rejected it over the claim that some people were disenfranchised from voting in Eti-Osa. In the process, the police and the army were brought to maintain peace and order in the local government area.

Neighbourhoods
 Ikoyi
 Lekki Lagoon
 Port at Lekki
 Victoria Island
 Maroko (since demolished)

Education

Educational institutions in Eti Osa local government area include both local and International schools, institutions and organisations. The local institutions consist of colleges of education, education research centres, secondary schools, training organisation and consultants and a university among others.

Some of the International schools include:
British International School Lagos (Victoria Island)
Lycée Français Louis Pasteur de Lagos (Victoria Island)
Lekki British School (Lekki Peninsula)

Important places in Eti-Osa

References

External links

 Eti-Osa Local Government

 
Local Government Areas in Lagos State
Populated coastal places in Lagos State
Local Government Areas in Yorubaland